The 2009–10 ASEAN Basketball League season was the first season of competition since its establishment. A total of six teams competed in the league. The regular season began on 10 October 2009 and ended on 24 January 2010, which was followed by a post-season involving the top four teams.

The Philippine Patriots of Philippines had the #1 seed at the conclusion of the regular season.

Teams

Regular season

Standings

Results

Matches

October

November

December

January

Playoffs

Semi-finals
The semi-finals is a best-of-three series, with the higher seeded team hosting Game 1, and 3, if necessary.

|}

Finals
The Finals is a best-of-five series, with the higher seeded team hosting Game 1 and 2, and 5, if necessary.

|}

Statistics

Season leaders
Last update: End of Round 11

Season highs
Last update: End of Round 11

Teams

See 2009–2010 ABL team rosters.

References

External links
 The official website of the Asean Basketball League

 
2009–10 in Asian basketball leagues
2009-10
2009–10 in Philippine basketball
2009–10 in Malaysian basketball
2009–10 in Indonesian basketball
2009–10 in Singaporean basketball
2009–10 in Thai basketball
basketball
basketball